The 2015 Italian local elections were to be held on 31 May, with a second round on 14 June, concurrently with the Regional elections. In Italy, direct elections were held in 1,063 municipalities: in each municipality (comune) were chosen mayor and members of the City Council. Of the 1,603 municipalities, 15 were provincial capitals and 120 had a population higher than 15,000 inhabitants.

In Trentino-Alto Adige and Aosta Valley the elections were held on 10 May with a second ballot on 24 May.

Municipal councilors and mayors ordinarily serve a terms of five years.

Voting System
All mayoral elections in Italy in cities with a population higher than 15,000 use the same system.

Under this system voters express a direct choice for the mayor or an indirect choice voting for one of the parties of the candidate's coalition.

If no candidate receives a majority of votes, the top two candidates go to a second round two weeks later. The coalition of the elected mayor is guaranteed a majority of seats in the council with the attribution of extra seats, but the majority bonus system is not adopted by the cities of Trentino-Alto Adige. If a Mayor resigns, dies or is ousted from office after more than half the municipal councillors stepped down, an early municipal election (for the Mayor and for all municipal councillors) is called.

The City Council is elected at the same time as the mayor. Voters can vote for a list of candidates and can express up to 2 preferences for candidates of said list. In case of two preferences, they must be given to candidates of both genders. Seats are the attributed to parties proportionally, and for each party list the candidates with the highest number of preferences are elected.

Results
Majority of each coalition in 120 municipalities (comuni) with a population higher than 15,000:

Centre-left coalition: Trento, Bolzano, Aosta, Riva del Garda, San Giovanni in Fiore, Siderno, Cardito, Ercolano, San Giorgio a Cremano, Zagarolo, Senigallia, Moncalieri, Manfredonia, Pedara, Agrigento, Bollate, Lecco, Mantua, Segrate, Somma Lombardo, Cava de' Tirreni, Frattamaggiore, Marigliano, Mugnano di Napoli, San Nicola la Strada, Faenza, Albano Laziale, Colleferro, Macerata, Valenza, Trani, Casamassima, Mola di Bari, San Vito dei Normanni, Quartu Sant'Elena, Marsala, Bronte, Carini, Ispica, Milazzo, San Giovanni la Punta.
Centre-right coalition: Laives, Pomigliano d'Arco, Vibo Valentia, Bondeno, Fondi, Parabiago, Samarate, Capurso, Ceglie Messapica, Andria, Chieti, Matera, Gioia Tauro, Lamezia Terme, Caivano, Carovigno, Oria, Sestu, Arezzo, Pietrasanta, Viareggio, Enna, Barcellona Pozzo di Gotto, Licata.
Five Star Movement: Quarto, Porto Torres, Venaria Reale, Gela, Augusta.
Independent and others: Merano, Rovereto, Grumo Nevano, Orta di Atella, Sorrento, Mascali, Mussomeli, Nicosia, Raffadali, Trabia, Sanluri, Tempio Pausania, Angri, Bacoli, Casalnuovo di Napoli, Casavatore, Eboli, Giugliano in Campania, Terzigno, Ceccano, Fermo, Altamura, Cerignola, Latiano, Mesagne, Modugno, Nuoro, Silius, Ribera, Tremestieri Etneo.

Mayoral election results

City councils

Notes

Municipal elections in Italy
 
 
2015 elections in Italy
May 2015 events in Italy
June 2015 events in Italy